Gökhan Kaba (born 24 November 1983) is a Turkish football forward who last played for Tepecikspor.

External links
 Guardian Stats Centre

1983 births
Living people
Turkish footballers
İstanbul Başakşehir F.K. players
Süper Lig players
Çaykur Rizespor footballers
Kayseri Erciyesspor footballers
Adana Demirspor footballers
Association football forwards